The following is a list of actress Frances Conroys acting credits; including her appearances in film, television, and the theatre.

With over 100 acting credits to her name, Conroy is perhaps well known for her starring role as Ruth Fisher on the HBO series Six Feet Under. The role won her a Golden Globe Award and three Screen Actors Guild Awards.

Since Six Feet Under'''s ending, she guest starred in numerous television programs and had supporting roles in major motion pictures. She returned to television prominence in 2011, when she was cast in a recurring role on the FX anthology-horror series American Horror Story. Conroy's role garnered acclaim once again, being nominated for a Primetime Emmy Award as well as a Saturn Award. She then proceeded to appear in the next three seasons of the show, getting nominated for a second Primetime Emmy Award for her appearance in the third season. She also returned to American Horror Story as a guest in for its sixth and seventh seasons, entitled Roanoke and Cult before recurring in Apocalypse, the show's eighth season. In 2021, Conroy returned to the main cast for the show's tenth season, entitled Double Feature.

In 2015, she starred in the Hulu original series Casual, which was nominated for a Golden Globe Award for Best Television Series – Musical or Comedy for its first season and starred in The Mist in 2017. Since 2020, Conroy had also portrayed Eileen Wood on Netflix's Dead To Me''.

Film

Feature films

Television films

Television

Theatre

See also
List of awards and nominations received by Frances Conroy

References

External links
 
 
 
 
 

Actress filmographies
American filmographies